The Calling All Crows EP was released by reggae rock band, State Radio on August 11, 2009 as a preview for the upcoming album Let It Go, which was released September 29, 2009. It features three finished songs from Let It Go, and was released exclusively on Apple's iTunes Store as a showcase of that material.

Track listing
 Calling All Crows     – 3:40
 Knights of Bostonia     – 4:27
 Evolution     – 3:55

State Radio albums
2009 EPs